Peover Inferior is a civil parish in Cheshire East, England.  It contains five buildings that are recorded in the National Heritage List for England as designated listed buildings, all of which are at Grade II.  This grade is the lowest of the three gradings given to listed buildings and is applied to "buildings of national importance and special interest".  The parish is almost entirely rural, and the listed buildings consist of four houses and a public house.

See also

Listed buildings in Toft
Listed buildings in Peover Superior
Listed buildings in Nether Peover
Listed buildings in Plumley

References
Citations

Sources

 

Listed buildings in the Borough of Cheshire East
Lists of listed buildings in Cheshire